The yellow-throated nightingale-thrush or Gould's nightingale-thrush (Catharus dryas) is a species of bird in the family Turdidae native to Central America. It was first described in 1855 by English ornithologist John Gould.

Taxonomy and systematics
In 1878, the Sclater's nightingale-thrush (Catharus maculatus) was categorized as a subspecies of Catharus dryas based on the similar plumage. In 2017, a study showed that Catharus maculatus was not a subspecies of Catharus dryas, but a separate species of Spotted nightingale-thrush. The publication cited DNA sequencing, vocal data, and modeling of ecological niches as evidence that the two organisms were, in fact, different species.

Subspecies
Three subspecies are recognised:

 C. d. harrisoni - Phillips, AR & Rook, 1965: Found in Oaxaca (south-western Mexico)
 C. d. ovandensis - Brodkorb, 1938: Found in Chiapas  (south-western Mexico)
 C. d. dryas - 	(Gould, 1855): Found in western Guatemala, El Salvador and Honduras

Distribution and habitat
It is found from southern Mexico to Honduras. Its natural habitat is subtropical or tropical moist montane forests, and inland wetlands.

Behaviour and ecology

It has a lifespan of around 4.2 years, and is not considered a migratory species.

References

Catharus
Birds of Mexico
Birds of Guatemala
Birds of Honduras
Birds described in 1855
Taxonomy articles created by Polbot